Al-Falaq or The Daybreak (al-falaq) is the 113th chapter (sūrah) of the Qur'an. It is a brief five ayat (verse) surah, asking God for protection from evil: 
۝ Say, "I seek refuge in the Lord of daybreak,
۝  From the evil of His creation 
۝ And from the evil of darkness when it settles
۝ And from the evil of the blowers in knots
۝ And from the evil of an envier when he envies.

Context
This surah and the 114th (and last) surah in the Qur'an, an-Nās, are collectively referred to as al-Mu'awwidhatayn, "the Refuges", as both begin with "I seek refuge"; an-Nās tells to seek God for refuge from the evil from within, while al-Falaq tells to seek God for refuge from the evil from outside, so reading both of them would protect a person from his own mischief and the mischief of others.

Regarding the timing and contextual background of the believed revelation (asbāb al-nuzūl), it is an earlier "Meccan surah", which indicates a revelation in Mecca rather than in Medina. Early Muslims were persecuted in Mecca where Muhammed was not a leader, and not persecuted in Medina, where he was a protected leader.

The word "al-Falaq" in the first verse, a generic term referring to the process of 'splitting', has been restricted in most translations to one particular type of splitting, namely 'daybreak' or 'dawn'.

Verse 4 refers to one of the soothsayer's techniques: partially tieing a knot, uttering a curse, spitting into the knot and pulling it tight. In the pre-Islamic period, soothsayers claimed the power to cause various illnesses. According to soothsayers the knot had to be found and untied before the curse could be lifted. This practice is condemned in verse 4.

Text and meaning

Text and transliteration
Hafs from Aasim ibn Abi al-Najud

¹ 

² 

³ 

⁴ 

⁵ 

Warsh from Nafi‘ al-Madani

¹ 

² 

³ 

⁴ 

⁵

Meanings

Say: "I seek refuge with (Allah) the Lord of the daybreak,

"From the evil of what He has created;

"And from the evil of the darkening (night) as it comes with its darkness; (or the moon as it sets or goes away).

"And from the evil of the witchcrafts when they blow in the knots,

"And from the evil of the envier when he envies."

Say, "I seek refuge in the Lord of daybreak

From the evil of that which He created

And from the evil of darkness when it settles

And from the evil of the blowers in knots

And from the evil of an envier when he envies."

Say: I seek refuge with the Lord of the Dawn

From the mischief of created things;

From the mischief of Darkness as it overspreads;

From the mischief of those who practise secret arts;

And from the mischief of the envious one as he practises envy.

Say: I seek refuge in the Lord of the Daybreak

From the evil of that which He created;

From the evil of the darkness when it is intense,

And from the evil of malignant witchcraft,

And from the evil of the envier when he envieth.

Hadith
The first and foremost exegesis/tafsir of the Qur'an is found in hadith of Muhammad. Although scholars including ibn Taymiyyah claim that Muhammad has commented on the whole of the Qur'an, others including Ghazali cite the limited amount of narratives, thus indicating that he has commented only on a portion of the Qur'an. Ḥadīth (حديث) is literally "speech" or "report", that is a recorded saying or tradition of Muhammad validated by isnad; with Sirah Rasul Allah these comprise the sunnah and reveal shariah. According to Aishah, the life of Muhammad was practical implementation of Qur'an. Therefore, higher count of hadith elevates the importance of the pertinent surah from a certain perspective. This surah was held in special esteem in hadith, which can be observed by these related narratives. According to hadith, Muhammad used to recite this surah before sleeping every night.

 Abu 'Abdullah narrated that Ibn 'Abis Al-Juhani told him that: The Messenger of God [SAW] said to him: "O Ibn 'Abis, shall I not tell you of the best thing with which those who seek refuge with Allah may do so?" He said: "Yes, O Messenger of Allah." He said: "Say: I seek refuge with (Allah) the Lord of the daybreak." (Al-Falaq), "Say: I seek refuge with (Allah) the Lord of mankind." (Al-Nas) - these two Surahs."

 Aishah reported: Whenever the Messenger of Allah (ﷺ) went to bed, he would blow upon his hands recite Al-Mu'awwidhat; and pass his hands over his body (Al-Bukhari and Muslim).
 Aishah said : Every night when the prophet (May peace be upon him) went to his bed, he joined his hands and breathed into them, reciting into them: "say: he is Allah, One" (Al-Ikhlas) and say ; I seek refuge in the Lord of the dawn (Al-Falaq) and Say: I seek refuge in the Lord of men (Al-Nas). Then he would wipe as much of his body as he could with his hands, beginning with his head, his face and the front of his body, doing that three times.

 Uqba ibn Amir reported: The Messenger of Allah (ﷺ) said: "Do you not know that last night certain Ayat were revealed the like of which there is no precedence. They are: 'Say: I seek refuge with (Allah) the Rubb of the daybreak' (Al-Falaq), and 'Say: I seek refuge with (Allah) the Rubb of mankind' (Surah 114)."

 It is narrated from Muhammad that whoever recites this Surah in the month of Ramadhan in any of his prayers, it is as if he has fasted in Makkah and he will get the reward for performing Hajj and ‘Umra.
 Imam Muhammad al-Baqir said that in the prayer of Shafa’a (in Salaatul-layl) one should recite Surah al-Falaq in the first rak’aat and an-Naas in the second.

Notes

References

External links
Quran 113  Clear Quran translation
 
 The Holy Qur'an, translated by Abdullah Yusuf Ali
 Three translations at Project Gutenberg
 
Surah FalaqSurah Al-Falaq English Translation
Surah Al-Falaq translation and Transliteration

Falaq